Thirteen or So Minutes is an independent, short film directed by William Branden Blinn. It covers social and sexuality issues and has won prizes at the Rainbow Film Festival and NYIIFVF.

Premise
The plot centers on Lawrence and Hugh, who have just met and had sex spontaneously, even though neither of them has been attracted to men before. They talk about what has happened and why they each felt a strong desire to be so intimate with the other.

References 

2008 films
2000s English-language films